Pantego is a town in Tarrant County, Texas, United States. Its population was 2,394 at the 2010 census. It is entirely surrounded by the cities of Arlington and Dalworthington Gardens.  It is in the middle of the Dallas–Fort Worth metroplex, a metropolitan area spanning several counties.

History

The earliest Europeans in the area are thought to be the members of the De Soto expedition under Luis de Moscoso, in 1542. The expedition is thought to have camped near what is now Village Creek. European settlement in the Pantego area dates back at least to the 1840s. After the May 24, 1841 battle between Texas General Edward H. Tarrant and Native Americans of the Village Creek settlement, a trading post was established at Marrow Bone Spring in present-day Arlington. The rich soil of the area attracted farmers, and several agriculture-related businesses were well established by the late 19th century.

Settler and state representative Frederick Forney Foscue acquired the land that is now Pantego after the Civil War. He bought land, sold and rented it to other settlers in the area, and can be considered the first land developer of Pantego. According to local tradition, Colonel Foscue had a Native American friend named Pantego. In 1883, Colonel Foscue donated land for a school. Tradition holds the school was named Pantego in honor of Colonel Foscue's friend. The town took form shortly after and took the name Pantego, reflected now in the feathered Town of Pantego logo.

Originally incorporated in 1949, the town dissolved in February 1952 and reincorporated on May 22, 1952.

Geography

Pantego is located at  (32.715183, –97.154845).

According to the United States Census Bureau, the town has a total area of 1.0 square miles (2.6 km2), all of it land.

The town's southern border adjoins Dalworthington Gardens; both towns are completely surrounded by the city of Arlington.

Recreation
Bicentennial Park opened in 1976 and expanded in the 1990s.

Law and government

Pantego is a general law city.  It has a city council consisting of five members elected at large for staggered two-year terms and a mayor elected for a two-year term.

Pantego has a council-manager form of government.  It has full-time police and fire departments and several citizen committees.

Residents can obtain a library card from Arlington's library system.  With an Arlington library card, they can check out books at most public and state-university libraries in Texas through the TexShare program.

The United States Postal Service operates the Pantego Post Office in Arlington.

Demographics

2020 census

As of the 2020 United States census,  2,568 people, 1,064 households, and 672 families were residing in the town.

2000 census
As of the census of 2000, 2,318 people, 920 households, and 720 families were residing in the town. The population density was 2,331.0 people per square mile (904.0/km2). The 951 housing units had an average density of 956.3 per square mile (370.9/km2). The racial makeup of the town was 87.06% S. White, 8.58% African American, 0.22% Native American, 1.90% Asian, 0.22% Pacific Islander, 0.73% from other races, and 1.29% from two or more races. Hispanics or Latinos of any race were 3.67% of the population.

Of the 920 households, 26.6% had children under 18 living with them, 63.0% were married couples living together, 12.1% had a female householder with no husband present, and 21.7% were not families; 18.6% of all households were made up of individuals, and 10.8% had someone living alone who was 65 or older. The average household size was 2.52 and the average family size was 2.84.

In the town, the age distribution was 22.3% under 18, 6.1% from 18 to 24, 21.8% from 25 to 44, 27.6% from 45 to 64, and 22.3% who were 65 or older. The median age was 45 years. For every 100 females, there were 91.9 males. For every 100 females age 18 and over, there were 85.5 males.

The median income for a household in the town was $68,571, and for a family was $71,938. Males had a median income of $55,227 versus $37,969 for females. The per capita income for the town was $30,471. About 5.7% of families and 6.3% of the population were below the poverty line, including 14.7% of those under age 18 and none of those age 65 or over.

Education 
No colleges or universities are present in this small community, but the town lies within driving distance to Arlington and the rest of the Dallas/Fort Worth metropolitan area, which contains a number of colleges and universities, including the University of Texas at Arlington , the Tarrant County College system, and Arlington Baptist University.

Pantego lies within the Arlington Independent School District. Pantego is zoned to Hill Elementary School, Bailey Junior High School, and Arlington High School.

In Texas, school district boundaries do not always follow city and county boundaries because all aspects of the school district government apparatus, including school district boundaries, are separated from the city and county government. In the case of Pantego, no independent school district (ISD) was ever established. The proximity of the already established Arlington ISD led to the entirety of Pantego being served by the AISD since the middle of the 20th century.

Pantego Christian Academy has facilities within the city limits of Pantego and Arlington. Around 2008, the school bought a  building at 2221 West Park Row Drive to use as a high school campus.

References

External links
 Town of Pantego official website
 Pantego Fire Department
 Pantego Police Department
 William J. Bardin family papers at the University of Texas at Arlington special collections

Dallas–Fort Worth metroplex
Towns in Tarrant County, Texas
Towns in Texas